Trichodocus strandi is a species of beetle in the family Cerambycidae. It was described by Stephan von Breuning in 1940. It is known from Cameroon. It contains the varietas Trichodocus strandi var. gillieri.

References

Endemic fauna of Cameroon
Theocridini
Beetles described in 1940